is a Japanese footballer who plays for Suzuka Unlimited FC.

Club statistics
Updated to 23 February 2017.

References

External links

Profile at Kamatamare Sanuki

1989 births
Living people
Ritsumeikan University alumni
Association football people from Hyōgo Prefecture
Japanese footballers
J2 League players
Japan Football League players
Kamatamare Sanuki players
Suzuka Point Getters players
Association football midfielders